The 1979–80 season was Nottingham Forest's 115th year in existence and third campaign consecutive in the First Division.

Summary

During summer chairman Stuart M. Dryden reinforced the squad with several players, Left-back Frank Clark announced his retirement and the club bought Frank Gray to cover the spot after bought from Leeds United in £500,000.   With the team plummeting to mid-table the club loaned in Forward Charlie George from Southampton F.C. who only played 4 matches  and failed to reinforce the offensive line already weakened after the departure of Tonny Woodcock to 1.FC Köln and the injury of Trevor Francis. For replacing Archie Gemmill in midfield, the club bought Asa Hartford from Manchester City only to be a failure in three matches played being sold to Everton F.C. Also, for the second half of the season arrived midfielder Stan Bowles from Queen's Park Rangers but the transfer did not work out owing to differences between Bowles and manager Clough. The squad already playing four tournaments resented the disappointing of new arrivals in League finishing on a 5th spot.

The club refused to play the Intercontinental Cup against Paraguayan side and Copa Libertadores Champion Club Olimpia. Meanwhile in FA Cup the team was eliminated by Liverpool F.C. in fourth round. On the contrary, in League Cup the squad advance to the Final being defeated 0-1 by Wolverhampton Wanderers by a single goal. However, the squad won its first European Super Cup with a 2-1 aggregate score after two legs against FC Barcelona. In the European Cup as the holders, the club which advanced again to the Final and clinched its second successive title after defeating 1-0 West German side Hamburg SV in spite of being reinforced in midfield by ex-Liverpool fan favourite Kevin Keegan.

Squad

Transfers

Competitions
A list of Nottingham Forest's matches in the 1979–80 season.

First Division

League table

Results by round

Matches

League Cup

Second round

Third round

Fourth round

Quarterfinals

Semifinals

Final

FA Cup

Third round

Fourth round

European Cup

Round of 32

Eightfinals

Quarterfinals

Semifinals

Final

UEFA Super Cup

Statistics

Players statistics

Notes

References

Nottingham Forest F.C. seasons
Nottingham Forest F.C.
UEFA Champions League-winning seasons